Emil Henriques (December 19, 1883 – November 19, 1957) was a Swedish sailor who competed in the 1912 Summer Olympics. He was a crew member of the Swedish boat Sans Atout, the boat that won the silver medal in the 8 metre class.

References

External links
profile

1883 births
1957 deaths
Swedish male sailors (sport)
Sailors at the 1912 Summer Olympics – 8 Metre
Olympic sailors of Sweden
Olympic silver medalists for Sweden
Olympic medalists in sailing
Medalists at the 1912 Summer Olympics
20th-century Swedish people